The 2009–10 football season was Northampton Town's 32nd season in the Football League Two, the fourth division of English football, and their 95th as a professional club. The team's new shirt supplier was Erreà, and the shirt sponsor was Jackson Grundy.
The season covered the period from 1 July 2018 to 30 June 2019.

Players

Competitions

League Two

League table

Results summary

As of games played 8 May 2010

League position by match

Matches

FA Cup

Carling Cup

Johnstone's Paint Trophy

Appearances, goals and cards

Awards

Transfers

Transfers in

Transfers out

Loans in

Loans out

References

External links
Northampton Town F.C. - Official website

Northampton Town F.C. seasons
Northampton Town